Macarena Aguilar Díaz (born 12 March 1985) is a Spanish former handball player who played for the Spanish national team.

Club career
Aguilar started her senior career at Balonmano Sagunto, where she stayed for eight years. With Sagunto, she won every domestic competition: the Spanish Championship, Spanish League Cup, Queen's Cup and Spanish Supercup. In July 2009, she moved to Estella to play for Itxako. From 2016 to 2018, she played for the German team Thüringer HC.

National team
Aguilar won a gold medal with the Spanish national team at the 2005 Mediterranean Games in Almería. She won silver medals at the 2008 European Championship, where the Spanish team reached the final after defeating Germany in the semifinal, and the 2014 European Championship, where the team was defeated by Norway in the final.

From 2004 to 2017, Aguilar played 240 matches and scored 638 goals for the national team. She competed at the 2011 World Women's Handball Championship in Brazil, where the Spanish team placed third. She was also part of the Spanish team that won bronze at the 2012 Summer Olympics and the 2011 World Championship.

Injuries and awards
Aguilar broke her nose five times during her career. She missed nine months of competition in 2008 due to a knee injury, and fractured a metatarsal bone on her foot at the 2012 European Championships. In 2013, she received the Bronze Medal of the Royal Order of Sports Merit.

References

1985 births
Living people
Sportspeople from the Province of Ciudad Real
Spanish female handball players
Olympic medalists in handball
Olympic handball players of Spain
Handball players at the 2012 Summer Olympics
Handball players at the 2016 Summer Olympics
Olympic bronze medalists for Spain 
Medalists at the 2012 Summer Olympics
Expatriate handball players
Spanish expatriate sportspeople in Denmark
Spanish expatriate sportspeople in Hungary
Spanish expatriate sportspeople in Russia
Spanish expatriate sportspeople in Germany
Győri Audi ETO KC players
Siófok KC players
Mediterranean Games gold medalists for Spain
Competitors at the 2005 Mediterranean Games
Mediterranean Games medalists in handball
Competitors at the 2009 Mediterranean Games